The English women's cricket team toured Australia in early 2011, where they were defending the Women's Ashes. Australia won 2 one-day internationals to England's 1, while England won 4 Twenty20 matches to Australia's 1. The only Test match played was won by Australia, who thus regained the Women's Ashes.

Squads

English women's squad
 Charlotte Edwards (captain, Kent)
 Katherine Brunt (Yorkshire)
 Holly Colvin (Sussex)
 Jenny Gunn (vice-captain, Nottinghamshire)
 Lydia Greenway (Kent)
 Lauren Griffiths (Cheshire)
 Isa Guha (Berkshire)
 Danielle Hazell (Yorkshire)
 Heather Knight (Berkshire)
 Laura Marsh (Sussex)
 Beth Morgan (Middlesex)
 Susie Rowe (Kent)
 Claire Taylor (Berkshire) 
 Fran Wilson (Somerset)
 Danni Wyatt (Staffordshire)

One Day International series

1st ODI

2nd ODI

3rd ODI

Twenty20 Internationals

1st T20I

2nd T20I

3rd T20I

4th T20I

5th T20I

Test

Test Match

External links
Series site at Cricinfo.com

International cricket competitions in 2011
January 2011 sports events in Australia
The Women's Ashes
2011 in English women's cricket
2010–11 Australian women's cricket season
Australia 2011
Women's international cricket tours of Australia
2011 in women's cricket